Frances Elizabeth Willard is a public artwork designed by American artist Lorado Taft, located in the rotunda of the Indiana State House, in Indianapolis, Indiana, United States. It is a bronze plaque, given by the Women's Christian Temperance Union, commemorating the fiftieth anniversary of Frances Elizabeth Willard's election as President of the WCTU.

Description
This bronze plaque measures 32 inches wide, 49 3/4 inches tall, and 1/2 inch deep.  It has an inscription at the top and an inscription at the bottom.  A right side profile relief of Frances Elizabeth Willard is between the two inscriptions. She is depicted wearing a dress with leg-o-mutton sleeves and a high lace neck.  Her hair is pulled back into a bun.

The inscription on the top of the plaque reads:

The inscription on the bottom of the plaque reads:

The artist's signature is located on the front, proper left, bottom of the relief.  It reads, "Lorado Taft Sc. 1929." The plaque is in excellent condition.

Historical information

Location history
This plaque is located in the Indiana Statehouse Rotunda on the main floor.

In 1968, there were new rules proposed to Governor Roger D. Branigin by Hubert H. Hawkins, director of the Indiana Historical Bureau, Mrs. Floyd Hopper, head of the Indiana Division in the Indiana State Library, and Robert D. Starrett, curator of the Indiana State Museum regarding the display of paintings, busts, plaques and other memorials within the Indiana Statehouse. The guidelines were created to ensure a stable and continuous policy prevail when choosing the artwork to be displayed in the Statehouse.

If these guidelines were accepted, which they were not, the Frances Elizabeth Willard plaque would have been removed, along with the Sarah T. Bolton plaque.

Recommended guidelines included:
 Those individuals or events being commemorated should have a significant relationship to Indiana and/or Indiana history.
 Each display should have statewide importance.
 Individuals should not be honored until 10 years after their death.
 Statuary and plaques should be made of durable materials and busts should have identifying information attached to it.
 All items should be artistically acceptable.
 Those not meeting these requirements should be removed.

See also
 Fountain of Time
 Black Hawk Statue
 Fountain of the Great Lakes

References

External links
 Indiana Statehouse Tour Office
 View more photos of this piece and other artwork found at the Indiana Statehouse

1929 sculptures
Indiana Statehouse Public Art Collection
Monuments and memorials in Indiana
Sculptures by Lorado Taft
Bronze sculptures in Indiana
Reliefs in the United States